John Dillon (9 November 1942 – 11 August 2019) was a Scottish former professional footballer who played as a winger for Sunderland, Brighton & Hove Albion and Crewe Alexandra in the English Football League and for Albion Rovers, Queen of the South, Stranraer and Hamilton Academical in the Scottish League. He began his career with junior club Bellshill Athletic and later played for Ashfield.

Dillon went on to become a councillor in the Monklands district. He died in August 2019 at the age of 76.

References

1942 births
2019 deaths
Footballers from Coatbridge
Scottish footballers
Association football wingers
Bellshill Athletic F.C. players
Sunderland A.F.C. players
Brighton & Hove Albion F.C. players
Crewe Alexandra F.C. players
Albion Rovers F.C. players
Queen of the South F.C. players
Stranraer F.C. players
Hamilton Academical F.C. players
Ashfield F.C. players
Scottish Junior Football Association players
English Football League players
Scottish Football League players